Joe DeRosa may refer to:

 Joe DeRosa (comedian) (born 1977), American stand-up comedian
 Joe DeRosa (referee) (born 1957), American basketball referee